Ernest Colvin Kelaart (29 June 1922 – 11 September 2008) was a cricketer who played first-class cricket for Ceylon between 1950 and 1958. He toured Pakistan in 1949-50.

He married Barbara Nellie Joseph in Colombo in 1952. They had three sons and three daughters, and moved with their family to Australia. He died in Melbourne in September 2008.

References

External links

1922 births
2008 deaths
Sri Lankan cricketers
All-Ceylon cricketers
Alumni of Royal College, Colombo
Sri Lankan emigrants to Australia